Adelaide Daughaday (March 2, 1845 – July 1, 1919) was an American Christian missionary in Japan.

Early life 
Mary Adelaide Daughaday was born in Guilford, New York, the daughter of William Hamilton Daughaday and Hannah Elizabeth Bell Daughaday.

Career 
Daughaday arrived in Japan as a missionary in 1883. She taught at Baikwa Girls' School in Osaka, in Tottori, and for her last twenty years in Sapporo. She made a particular effort for temperance in Japan. She spent time lecturing in the United States on furloughs in 1895 to 1897, and 1907 to 1908.

Daughaday wrote about Japan for American church and secular publications. In 1916, she described events surrounded the coronation of Emperor Taishō, which worried her because it included bottles of sake as imperial gifts. One of her last reports from Sapporo mentioned the end of World War I and the 1918 flu pandemic: "Like the rest of the world, Japan has suffered from influenza. Schools have been closed, and the ordinary routine of life confused."

Personal life 
Daughaday died in Sapporo in 1919, aged 74 years.

References 

1845 births
1919 deaths
American Christian missionaries
Christian missionaries in Japan
People from Guilford, New York
Missionary educators
Female Christian missionaries